Dai Hong Dan is a North Korean cargo ship which was hijacked in October 2007 by pirates near Mogadishu. The crew was able to retake the ship by storming the bridge and the engineering spaces, leaving one pirate dead in the action. Six Korean sailors were also injured during the fight; three critically.

A United States Navy guided missile destroyer, was the nearest coalition force in the region. After reaching the scene, James E. Williams deployed a SH-60B helicopter and a VBSS (Visit, Board, Search, and Seizure) team to secure the scene. Navy medical personnel then provided care for the injured crew members.

See also
 
 
 List of North Korean merchant ships

References

Maritime incidents in 2007
Piracy in Somalia
Merchant ships of North Korea
1978 ships